Eugenio López-Chacarra (born 22 March 2000) is a Spanish professional golfer.

Early life
Chacarra was born in Madrid, Spain. His sister, Carolina, also plays college golf in the United States, at Wake Forest University.

Amateur career
Chacarra attended Oklahoma State University, where he studied Sports Management, Finance and Psychology. He was a first team All-American and reached a high of number two in the World Amateur Golf Ranking, before turning professional and joining LIV Golf in June 2022, reportedly on a three-year contract. Two months before then, he had announced that he would be returning for a fifth year at Oklahoma State, despite qualifying for the Korn Ferry Tour through the PGA Tour University rankings.

Professional career
In October 2022, Chacarra gained his first professional victory, winning the LIV Golf Invitational Bangkok by three strokes from Patrick Reed; his Fireballs team also won team component.

Amateur wins
2017 Grand Prix de Landes
2019 Copa de Andalusia
2021 European Amateur Team Championship (individual medal)
2022 Amer Ari Invitational, National Invitational Tournament, NCAA Columbus Regional

Source:

Professional wins (1)

LIV Golf Invitational Series wins (1)

1Co-sanctioned by the MENA Tour

Team appearances

Amateur
European Boys' Team Championship (representing Spain): 2017, 2018 (winners)
Palmer Cup (representing the international team): 2021
European Amateur Team Championship (representing Spain): 2019, 2021

Source:

References

External links

Spanish male golfers
LIV Golf players
Oklahoma State Cowboys golfers
Golfers from Madrid
2000 births
Living people
21st-century Spanish people